Still Flexin, Still Steppin is a mixtape by American rapper YoungBoy Never Broke Again. It was released on February 21, 2020, by Never Broke Again and Atlantic Records. It features a lone collaboration with the rapper Quando Rondo on the track "Suited Panamera". YoungBoy Never Broke Again also released a music video for the song "Lil Top".

The mixtape debuted at number two on the US Billboard 200 with 91,000 album-equivalent units in its first week, becoming YoungBoy Never Broke Again's second-highest charting album after his 2019 number-one album AI YoungBoy 2. The mixtape was certified gold by the Recording Industry Association of America (RIAA) in October 2020.

Background
The mixtape includes the previously released tracks "Bad Bad", "Knocked Off" and "Fine by Time".

Commercial performance
Still Flexin, Still Steppin debuted at number two on the US Billboard 200 with 91,000 album-equivalent units in its first week, most of which came from streams, making it the most streamed album of the week. In its second week, the album dropped to number ten on the chart, earning an additional 44,000 units. On October 20, 2020, the mixtape was certified gold by the Recording Industry Association of America (RIAA) for combined sales and album-equivalent units of over 500,000 units in the United States.

Track listing

Notes
  signifies a co-producer

Charts

Weekly charts

Year-end charts

Certifications

References

2020 mixtape albums
YoungBoy Never Broke Again albums